Richard Hoghton or Houghton (c.  1322 – c. 1422) was an English knight and the Member of Parliament for Lancashire in February 1383 and again in 1402.

He served as High Sheriff of Lancashire for 1399–1400.

References

1320s births
1420s deaths
English MPs February 1383
English MPs 1402
High Sheriffs of Lancashire
Members of the Parliament of England (pre-1707) for Lancashire